Raudeggi is a mountain in Skjåk Municipality in Innlandet county, Norway. The mountain is surrounded by several other notable mountains including Langvasseggi to the northwest, Kvitlenova to the west, Mårådalsfjellet to the south, and Sandåtinden and Skridalaupen to the southwest. The glacier Raudeggbreen is located on the north side of the mountain.

See also
List of mountains of Norway

References

Skjåk
Mountains of Innlandet